William D. McArthur (July 28, 1918 – April 24, 1997) was an American football player and coach.  He served three stints as the head football coach at Western Oregon University, from 1947 to 1954, from 1956 to 1982, and in 1991, compiling a record of 180–124–6.  McArthur spent part of one off-season with the Chicago Rockets of the All-America Football Conference (AAFC) in 1946.

Head coaching record

College

References

1918 births
1997 deaths
Chicago Rockets players
UC Santa Barbara Gauchos football players
Western Oregon Wolves football coaches
High school football coaches in Oregon
People from Keokuk, Iowa
Players of American football from Iowa